Studio Davout is a recording studio located in Paris, France. It was created in 1965 by Yves Chamberland later joined by Claude Ermelin. It was built in the 1,200 m² of an old cinema, "Le Davout", which opened prior to 1946.

Albums recorded at the studio

Rika Zaraïm²
 Prague (EP) (1966)
France Gall
 Les sucettes (EP) (1966)
Francis Lai
 A Man and a Woman (Soundtrack) (1966)
Michel Legrand
 The Young Girls of Rochefort (1967)
 The Thomas Crown Affair (1968)
Patrick Rondat
 Just for Fun (1989)
 Rape of the Earth (1991)
Sheila
 Adios Amor (EP) (1967)
Brigitte Fontaine with Jean-Claude Vannier 
 Brigitte Fontaine Est...Folle (1968)
Karlheinz Stockhausen
 Aus den sieben Tagen (1969)
Archie Shepp
 Blasé (1969)
Serge Gainsbourg
 Cannabis (film score) (1970)
Nico
 Desertshore (1970)
Ange
 Caricatures (1972)
Keith Jarrett
 Staircase (1976)
The Cure
 Pornography (1980)
Jon and Vangelis
 The Friends of Mr Cairo (1981)
Art Blakey and The Jazz Messengers
 Album of the Year (1981)
Nina Simone
 Fodder on My Wings (1982)
Keith Emerson
 'Nighthawks' soundtrack with Opera de Paris Orchestre (1983)
Echo & the Bunnymen
 Ocean Rain (1984)
The Cure 
 Pornography (1982)
Mylène Farmer
 "Maman a tort" (7" single) (1984)
Ozzy Osbourne
The Ultimate Sin (1986) 
Herbie Hancock
 Round Midnight (Soundtrack) (1986)
Dexter Gordon
 The Other Side of Round Midnight (1986)
The Colourfield
 Deception (1987)
Duran Duran
 Big Thing (1988)
Les Négresses Vertes
 Mlah (1988)
Les Rita Mitsouko
 Marc & Robert (1988)
 Re (1990)
Stéphane Grappelli and Yo-Yo Ma
 Anything Goes: Stephane Grappelli & Yo-Yo Ma Play (Mostly) Cole Porter (1989)
Talking Heads
 Naked (1988)
Jeanne Mas
 Les Crises de l'âme (1989)
 L'art des femmes (1990)
Jean-Luc Ponty
 Tchokola (1991)
 No Absolute Time (1993)
Abbey Lincoln and Hank Jones
 When There Is Love (1992)
Khaled
 Sahra (1996)
Alain Bashung
 Fantaisie militaire (1998)
 Gong
 Shapeshifter (1991)
Scott Walker
 Pola X (Soundtrack) (1999)
Jenifer
 Jenifer (2002)
The Skatalites
 From Paris with Love (2002)
Alizée
 Mes Courants Électriques (2003)
Stéphane Meer
 Vice-Versa (TV show theme) (2002)
Nolwenn Leroy
 Histoires Naturelles (2005)
Rinôçérôse
 Schizophonia (2005)
Dee Dee Bridgewater
 Red Earth (2007)
Yann Tiersen
 Tabarly (Soundtrack) (2008)
Martin Solveig
 C'est la Vie (2008)
Misanthrope
 IrremeDIABLE (2008)
Rihanna
 Rated R (2009)
Bertrand Cantat, Pascal Humbert, Bernard Falaise, Alexander MacSween
 Chœurs (2011)
Sexion d'Assaut
 L'Apogée (2012)
Damien Saez
 Miami (2013)
 Indila
 Mini World'' (2014)

References

External links
  
 

Recording studios in France
Mass media companies established in 1965
Former cinemas
Buildings and structures in Paris